Betty Troublesome Creek is a stream in Knott County, Kentucky, in the United States.

The name Betty Troublesome honors "Aunt Betty", a woman who was a first settler in the area.

See also
List of rivers of Kentucky

References

Rivers of Knox County, Kentucky
Rivers of Kentucky